Ninidae is a family of true bugs in the order Hemiptera. There are about 5 genera and 14 described species in Ninidae.

Genera
These five genera belong to the family Ninidae:
 Cymoninus Breddin, 1907
 Neoninus Distant, 1893
 Ninomimus Lindberg, 1934
 Ninus Stal, 1860
 Paraninus Scudder, 1957

References

Further reading

External links

Lygaeoidea
Heteroptera families
Articles created by Qbugbot